Elena Gibson is a professional dancer pole dance choreographer, instructor and performer who has played a leading role in the development of pole dancing as an art form and sport across the world.

She was the first World Pole Dancing Champion when crowned Miss Pole Dance World in 2005, before being controversially disqualified 24 hours later. She is the head of the Artistic committee of POSA world federation, the UK representative of the International Pole Federation (IPF), the European representative of the International Pole Fitness Federation (IPFF) and a member of the International Dance Council (CID UNESCO).

Career
Elena trained in classical ballet at Canada's National Ballet School in Toronto from a young age, where she was awarded several years' full scholarship. She graduated from there in 1995 and began a career as a ballerina, first with The National Ballet of Canada and later with the Bayerisches Staatsballett (Bavarian State Ballet) in Germany, along the way winning the Professional Young Dancers Competition in Italy in 1996.

In March 2000, she was seriously injured in a car accident which forced her retirement from professional ballet. It was while recovering from the accident that she discovered pole dancing as a way to regain fitness. This then inspired her new career as a performer and choreographer of modern dance routines in a style that fused the classical elegance of ballet with the gymnastic and acrobatic moves of pole dancing.

In 2003 she moved to London United Kingdom and in 2005 she won Miss Pole Dance UK  and then the inaugural Miss Pole Dance World, becoming the first ever World Pole Dancing Champion, with her Black Swan routine. She was later controversially disqualified from the World title because the removal of her tutu as she transformed from ballerina to pole dancer during her routine was deemed to constitute stripping (which was not allowed by the rules).

In 2006, she founded London's Pole Dancing School and in 2017 she founded The London Studios in Italy (Milan) where she currently teaches. Her teaching has received widespread recognition. She was the UK's first Level 3 Pole Dancing Instructor (appointed by Pole Dance Community) and in 2012 the International Pole Dance Fitness Association (IPDFA) named her Pole Dance Instructor of the Year. She has also appeared as a judge at numerous pole dance competitions across the world.

Since 2006 she has also been a leading advocate in the development of pole dancing as an art form and as a sport, representing the UK on the IPF and working as a board member and European representative on the IPFF. She is also a board member of Equity's Pole Dance Working Party and their Choreographer's Committee.

Achievements
 Winner Miss Pole Dance UK 2005
 Winner Miss Pole Dance World 2005
 Winner Pole Dance Instructor of the Year 2012 by IPDFA

Qualifications
 Member of Equity
 PDC Pioneer Award 
 Certified Ishta yoga instructor
 Head of the Artistic committee of POSA Federation 
 UK representative board member of the International Pole Federation 
 European representative board member of the International Pole Fitness Federation 
 Member of the International Dance Council

References

External links
Elena Gibson

English female dancers
1976 births
Living people